Joe Pat Tolson (April 15, 1941 – February 3, 2019) was a Democratic member of the North Carolina General Assembly representing the state's twenty-third House district, including constituents in Edgecombe and Wilson counties.  A retired educator from Pinetops, North Carolina, Tolson retired after the 2013-2014 session, serving his ninth term in the state House.
He was replaced by Shelly Willingham. Tolson died in 2019 from respiratory failure at a hospital in Tarboro, North Carolina.

Tolson received his bachelor's and master's degrees from Barton College and University of Virginia. He served as assistant vice-president for Edgecombe Community College.

Electoral history

2012

2010

2008

2006

2004

2002

2000

References

|-

1941 births
2019 deaths
Democratic Party members of the North Carolina House of Representatives
20th-century American politicians
21st-century American politicians
People from Edgecombe County, North Carolina
Barton College alumni
University of Virginia alumni
Educators from North Carolina